Borek  is a small village in Gmina Kamionka (Kamionka Commune), Lubartów County in Poland in Lublin Voivodeship. A small group of farmsteads 2 km southwest of Kamionka, on the north side of the country road to Samoklęski. The farmsteads are next to the edge of a small wood.

References

Villages in Lubartów County